Charles Ennis may refer to:

 Kerr Cuhulain, the pen name of Canadian occult author Charles Ennis
 Charles D. Ennis (1843–1930), American soldier and Medal of Honor recipient